Brasmex – Brasil Minas Express Ltda. was a cargo airline based in Sao Paulo, Brazil.

History
The airline was established on January 2, 2001, headed by Carlos Hamilton Martins Silva. With operational headquarters at Viracopos International Airport, it has effectively operated since December 14, 2002, since flights were only allowed from Guarulhos International Airport, Brasmex operated with a single Douglas DC-10-30 leased from the CIT Group.

It was to receive a second DC-10, of the 3 initially planned to be operating by the end of 2003. It was an investment of US$50 million, of which US$20 million was employed in structure, maintenance, pilots and technical staff.

The airline was invested with US$50 million, of which US$20 million was employed in structure, maintenance, pilots and technical staff. The company even transported 26 million tons per kilometer of cargo, 70% of which being from the international market. In 2003, a total of 139 flights were carried out, of which 85 were abroad and 54 in the domestic market.

Brasmex stopped its activities in January 2004. It ceased operations in February or March 2004 due to financial issues.

Destinations
Brasmex operated cargo services to:

Belo Horizonte
Rio de Janeiro
São Paulo
Manaus

Bogota

Milan

Luxembourg City

Miami

Caracas

Fleet
Brasmex included the following aircraft:

 1 McDonnell Douglas DC-10-30F (PR-BME)

See also
List of defunct airlines of Brazil

References

Defunct airlines of Brazil
Airlines established in 2001
Airlines disestablished in 2004
Defunct companies of Brazil